A Commentary on the General Prologue to The Canterbury Tales is a 1948 doctoral dissertation by Muriel Bowden that examines historical backgrounds to characters in Geoffrey Chaucer's The Canterbury Tales within the context of its General Prologue.

References

 
 

 
 
 
 

1948 non-fiction books
The Canterbury Tales
English-language books